Jason John Stanford (born January 23, 1977) is a former left-handed Major League Baseball starting pitcher and current Pitching coach for the rookie level Danville Braves. His father, Keith Stanford, still lives in Tucson. He is a 1995 graduate of Canyon del Oro High School in Oro Valley, Arizona, a suburb of Tucson. Stanford attended Barton County Community College in Great Bend, Kansas, in 1996 and 1997, where he was an Academic All-American. The Cleveland Indians signed Stanford as an amateur free agent in November 1999.

He made his major league debut with the Indians in 2003 against the Minn. Twins. In June 2007, Stanford was promoted to the Indians from Buffalo after the team optioned the struggling starter Jeremy Sowers to the Triple-A club. He made his season debut against the Florida Marlins on June 14 during interleague play, but soon found himself moved to the bullpen, and then demoted to Triple-A Buffalo, where he finished the season. After signing a minor league contract with the Washington Nationals, Stanford was released on April 21, . On April 25, 2008, Stanford signed a minor league contract with the Cleveland Indians, but was released on May 21. He signed with the Los Potros de Tijuana in June. Once season ended signed with the Chicago Cubs and was assigned to Triple-A Iowa in July. He became a free agent at the end of the season.  During his baseball career in the Indians organization, he won the prestigious Bob Feller award.

In 2009, Stanford became a baseball analyst for SportsTime Ohio and WKYC Channel 3 (NBC) in Cleveland. Beginning in the 2011 season, Stanford's role increased as he became the full-time pregame show analyst.

Stanford became head coach for the Howland Tigers Baseball team in Warren, Ohio, for the 2010–2011 and 2011–2012 seasons.

In August 2012, Stanford became the new pitching coach for the Youngstown State University baseball team.

In March 2015, Stanford was not renewed by Fox Sports for Indians Live or Tribe Report.  He currently is Co-host for ESPN Radio 1540 KNR2 Alicia Scicolone Show. He also started a college prep baseball organization in Niles, Oh to get high school student athletes to play college baseball.

Stanford was named as the pitching coach for the Rookie advanced level Danville Braves in the Atlanta Braves organization for the 2019 season.

References

External links

MLB.com player info page

1977 births
Living people
Charlotte 49ers baseball players
Major League Baseball pitchers
Baseball players from Tucson, Arizona
Cleveland Indians players
Buffalo Bisons (minor league) players
Akron Aeros players
Kinston Indians players
Mahoning Valley Scrappers players
Columbus Clippers players
Iowa Cubs players
Barton Cougars baseball players